Kato Kivides is a village in the Limassol District of Cyprus. In 1973 all the inhabitants were Turkish Cypriots.

References

Communities in Limassol District